Radvaň may refer to:

Radvaň, Banská Bystrica
Radvaň nad Dunajom, Nitra Region
Radvaň nad Laborcom, Prešov Region
Čiližská Radvaň, Trnava Region

See also 
 Radwan (disambiguation)